A bronze sculpture of Argentine general José de San Martín stands in Belgrave Square, London, United Kingdom. It was unveiled on 2 November 1994 by Prince Philip, Duke of Edinburgh accompanied by the Argentine  Ambassador Mario Cámpora. The statue is the work of Argentinian sculptor Juan Carlos Ferraro.

References

External links
 
 Statue: Jose de San Martin statue at London Remembers

1994 establishments in England
1994 sculptures
Belgravia
Bronze sculptures in the United Kingdom
Cultural depictions of José de San Martín
Monuments and memorials in London
Outdoor sculptures in London
Sculptures of men in the United Kingdom
San Martín
Statues of military officers
Statues of heads of government